Facundo Gonzalo Nazario (born 25 March 1995) is an Argentine professional footballer who plays as a centre-back.

Career
Nazario began his career in Torneo Argentino B with Unión Güemes. After eleven appearances and relegation, Nazario moved to Mitre in 2015 where he scored one goal in twenty-two fixtures in Torneo Federal B. In January 2016, Nazario joined Primera B Nacional side Gimnasia y Esgrima. He made his professional bow on 1 April 2018 against Independiente Rivadavia, having been on the substitutes bench sixteen times during 2016, 2016–17 and 2017–18. Nazario left Gimnasia midway through 2019–20 following ten appearances. In January 2020, Nazario headed to Juventud Antoniana of Torneo Regional Federal Amateur.

Career statistics
.

References

External links

1995 births
Living people
People from Salta
Argentine footballers
Association football defenders
Torneo Argentino B players
Primera Nacional players
Gimnasia y Esgrima de Jujuy footballers
Juventud Antoniana footballers
Sportspeople from Salta Province